DRIL or dril may refer to:

 Distal Revascularization and Interval Ligation, a surgical method of treating vascular access steal syndrome
 Directorio Revolucionario Ibérico de Liberación (Spanish) or Directório Revolucionário Ibérico de Libertação (Portuguese), name of an armed organization formed by Spaniards and Portuguese opponents of the Iberian dictatorships
 Damodar Ropeways & Infra Ltd, a constructor of aerial lifts in India
 dril, a pseudonymous Twitter user @dril best known for his idiosyncratic style of absurdist humor and non sequiturs

See also
 Drill (disambiguation)